Wild Flower (Spanish: Flor silvestre) is a 1943 Mexican historical film directed by Emilio Fernández and starring Dolores del Río and Pedro Armendáriz. It is the first Mexican movie of Dolores del Río after her career in Silent and Golden Age's Hollywood films. It's the first movie of an extended collaboration between Fernández-Del Rio-Armendáriz, Gabriel Figueroa (cinematography) and Mauricio Magdaleno (writer). It also marked the debut of Emilia Guiú in a small role as an extra. The film is considered one of the defining films of the Golden Age of Mexican cinema.

Plot 
In a small village in central Mexico in the early twentieth century, José Luis, son of the landowner Don Francisco, secretly marries Esperanza, a beautiful, but humble peasant. Disgusted by the wedding and because his son has become in a revolutionary, Don Francisco disinherits his son and kicks him out of his house. After the triumph of the Mexican Revolution, the couple lives happily until Jose Luis is forced to confront a couple of false revolutionaries who have kidnapped Esperanza and his young son.

Cast 
 Dolores del Río .... Esperanza
 Pedro Armendáriz .... José Luis Castro
 Emilio Fernández .... Rogelio Torres
 Miguel Ángel Ferriz .... don Francisco
 Armando Soto La Marina "Chicote" .... Reynaldo
 Agustín Isunza .... Nicanor
 Eduardo Arozamena .... Melchor
 Mimí Derba .... doña Clara
 Margarita Cortés .... sister of José Luis
 Manuel Dondé .... Úrsulo Torres
 José Elías Moreno .... colonel Pánfilo Rodríguez, Esperanza
 Lucha Reyes
 Trío Calaveras
 Pedro Galindo .... Pedro
 Carlos Riquelme .... Cura
 Tito Novaro .... son of Esperanza
 Emilia Guiú .... an extra

References

Bibliography
 Segre, Erica. Intersected Identities: Strategies of Visualisation in Nineteenth- and Twentieth-century Mexican Culture. Berghahn Books, 2007.

External links 

1940s Spanish-language films
Mexican black-and-white films
1943 films
1940s historical drama films
Mexican Revolution films
Mexican historical drama films
Films directed by Emilio Fernández
1943 drama films
1940s Mexican films